Let the Hard Times Roll is the third solo album by singer-songwriter David Ford, released on February 15, 2010.

Track listing
All songs written by David Ford.

 Panic
 Making Up For Lost Time
 Waiting for the Storm
 Surfin' Guantanamo Bay
 To Hell with the World
 Stephen
 Nothing at All
 Sylvia
 Meet Me in the Middle
 Missouri
 She's Not The One
 Hurricane
 Call To Arms

2010 albums
David Ford (musician) albums